The 3.7 cm KwK 36 L/45 (3.7 cm Kampfwagenkanone 36 L/45) was a German 3.7 cm cannon used primarily as the main armament of earlier variants of the German Sd.Kfz. 141 Panzerkampfwagen III medium tank. It was used during the Second World War.

It was essentially the 3.7 cm Pak 36 used as a tank gun.

Ammunition
The 3.7 cm KwK 36 used the 37 x 249 mm. R cartridge. Average penetration performance established against rolled homogeneous steel armor plate laid back at 30° from the vertical.

PzGr.18 (Armour-piercing)
 Weight of projectile: 
 Muzzle velocity: 

PzGr.40 (Armour-piercing composite rigid)
 Weight of projectile: 
 Muzzle velocity: 

PzGr.39 - Armour-piercing

Sprgr.Patr.34 - High-explosive

Vehicles mounted on
 Leichttraktor
 Neubaufahrzeug
 Sd.Kfz. 141 Panzerkampfwagen III versions A until E (de: Ausfertigung A bis E)
 Sd.Kfz. 141 Panzerkampfwagen III Ausf. F (the last 100 Ausf. F mounted the 5 cm KwK 38 L/42 gun)
 Sd.Kfz. 141 Panzerkampfwagen III Ausf. G (the first 50 Ausf. G)

Notes
2. http://www.wehrmacht-history.com/heer/panzer-armaments/3.7-cm-kwk-36.htm 

Tank guns of Germany
World War II artillery of Germany
37 mm artillery
World War II tank guns
Military equipment introduced in the 1930s